Mpuono, or Mpuun, is a Bantu language spoken by several hundred thousand people in the Democratic Republic of Congo.
Dialects include Mpuono, Mpuun (Mbuun, Kimbuun, Gimbunda).

Literature
Two Gospels were translated by E. and A. Haller, both of Mission de Mangungu.  The Gospel of John was published in 1935, as Lasang Labve la afun kangi Yone; and the Gospel of Matthew in 1951, as Lasang Labve lafun Matayo. These were published by the Société Biblique Britannique et Étrangère (British and Foreign Bible Society).  A collection of proverbs with French translations and explanations has been published.

References

Teke languages
Languages of the Democratic Republic of the Congo